Omasitis is an inflammation of the omasum, the third compartment of the stomach in ruminants. It usually accompanies rumenitis, and is often caused by infection with Fusobacterium necrophorum.

References 

Stomach disorders
Inflammations